The Kuss Quartet with Jana Kuss (violin), Oliver Wille (violin), William Coleman (viola) and Mikayel Hakhnazaryan (violoncello) is a Berlin-based string quartet. It was founded in 1991 at the Hochschule für Musik "Hanns Eisler" by the two violinists of the ensemble and has been playing in its current formation since 2008.

History 
Among the teachers of the Kuss Quartet were Walter Levin, Christoph Poppen, Eberhard Feltz and the Alban Berg Quartet. In the season 2001/02, the quartet accepted an invitation from Paul Katz of the Cleveland Quartet to study at the New England Conservatory of Music in Boston. There, they completed a Graduate Diploma Program for string quartet. The ensemble made its debut in 1993 at the Palace Concert of the German President Richard von Weizsäcker.

Awards 
The Quartet won international prizes at the Bubenreuth Competition (1997), the Karl-Klingler Competition (Berlin, 1998) and the International String Quartet Competition in Banff (Canada, 2001). In June 2002, the Kuss Quartet was awarded 1st prize at the International String Quartet Competition Premio Paolo Borciani in Reggio Emilia/Italy. At the same time as the Borciani competition, the ECHO (European Concert Halls Organisation) decided to award the Kuss Quartet the title of German Artist of the Rising Stars Programme. As a result, the Quartet made its debut in the 2003/04 season at the Royal Concertgebouw in Amsterdam, the Vienna Konzerthaus, Carnegie Hall, the Athens Concert Hall and the Birmingham Symphony Hall. The quartet was also supported by the Borletti-Buitoni Trust.

Since then, it has been one of the established ensembles of its generation, giving concerts in Europe, the US, South America and Japan.

The Kuss Quartet has played with chamber music partners such as the singer Mojca Erdmann, the cellist Miklós Perényi, the clarinettists Sharon Kam and Paul Meyer. It has developed special concert formats such as the classical music lounge at the Watergate Club, the discussion concerts "Explica" and programmes combining literature and music with the actor Udo Samel.

Recordings 
 Oehms Classics: Mendelssohn/Mozart Streichquartette (2006)
 Sony Classical: Bridges – Renaissance und Moderne (2007)
 Sony Classical: Haydn: Streichquartette
 Onyx: Schubert/Berg (2011)
 Onyx: Thème russe (2012)
 Onyx: Schubert String Quintet C Major (2013)
 Onyx: Brahms/Schönberg (with Mojca Erdmann, 2016)

References

External links 
 
  

German string quartets
Musical groups from Berlin
1991 establishments in Germany
Musical groups established in 1991